Eucereon metoidesis is a moth of the subfamily Arctiinae. It is found in Brazil and Guyana.

References

metoidesis
Moths described in 1905